Contraddiction is the second studio album by French industrial metal band Mass Hysteria, released on 2 February 1999. It is considered to be the band's breakthrough album.

The album received widespread acclaim from critics, and is credited with pioneering French metal.

Commercial performance 
The album peaked at number 20 on the French SNEP's Top Albums chart.

50,000 copies of the album were sold as of 2018, thus it is certified gold by the French National Syndicate of Phonographic Publishing (SNEP).

Track listing

Personnel 
 Mouss Kelai – vocals
 Yann Heurtaux – guitar
 Erwan Disez – guitar
 Stéphan Jaquet – bass
 Raphaël Mercier – drums

References 

1999 albums